The Biswaratna Dr Bhupen Hazarika International Solidarity Award was instituted by the Assam Sahitya Sabha and sponsored by the Numaligarh Refinery Limited (NRL). The award, conferred biennially, consists of a trophy, a citation and a cheque of 5 lakh.

Recipients 
 2013: Lubna Marium 
 2015: Adoor Gopalakrishnan
 2017: Prasanna Vithanage
 2019: Eric Khoo
 2021: Dr.Anil Saikia

References

Awards established in 2013
Civil awards and decorations of Assam
2013 establishments in Assam